The Taipei Fubon Braves are a professional basketball team, that currently plays in the Taiwanese P. League+, since the league's foundation in 2020. From 2014 to 2019, they played in the semi-professional Super Basketball League (SBL). They have also been part of the professional ASEAN Basketball League (ABL) since the 2019–20 ABL season.

The franchise dates back to 1983 when it was founded as the Chien-hong Men's Basketball Team (建弘男子籃球隊). Owned subsequently by Hung Min-tai (洪敏泰), owner of Tera Electronics (新銳/泰瑞電子), the team went by the same name as the corporation for a number of years until it joined the professional Chinese Basketball Alliance (CBA) as Tera Mars (泰瑞戰神) in 1994.

As a professional club, the Mars was a powerful competitor to the dominant Yulon Dinos and Hung Kuo Elephants. In the 1998 finals, it posed the strongest challenge the "Hung Kuo dynasty" had ever met when pushing the defending champions to the brink of elimination with a 3:1 advantage in the best-of-seven series – although they eventually let this opportunity for championship slip away. Wang Libin (C), Yen Hsing-su (PG), and the American import Todd Rowe (SF) were the core players on this team; they were led by head coach Chung Chih-Mong (鍾枝萌), the so-called "iron-and-blood coach" due to his aggressive leadership style.

Before the close down of the CBA in 1999, the Mars led the league in wins by a considerable margin in its last regular season that was never finished.  It remained a close contender for domestic championship around the turn of the century with a biggest frontcourt lineup Taiwan's amateur Division A conference (甲組聯賽) had ever seen.  This roster included Wang Libin (6'8") and Song Tao (6'10").

The team's initial mascot, Mars, was derived from the Roman god of war and had remained in spite of several changes of ownership.  It had not only carried the team through the flourish CBA era but also accompanied its members and fans in the midst of the financial turbulence of the late 1990s.  Between the ownership by the Kaohsiung-based Hanshin Group (漢神集團) and that by the Broadcasting Corporation of China (BCC), head coach Chung had to seek corporate sponsors on his own while his players spontaneously work without getting paid in order to keep their beloved team alive.

The Mars eventually became history following the takeover by Videoland Television Network in June 2004 when the team was renamed as the Videoland Hunters (緯來獵人).  Subsequently, the franchise was sold to Taiwan Mobile, a major mobile communication provider in Taiwan, and named after the company's as「Taiwan Mobile Basketball Team」. In 2014, the team was transferred to Taiwan Mobile's sister company in Fubon Group and renamed the Fubon Braves.

On 17 October 2019, the Fubon Braves officially announced that they signed O. J. Mayo for the upcoming ASEAN Basketball League (ABL) season. He becomes the most prominent player in the history of the Braves and ABL with his 8-year NBA experience during his professional career. The team once again renamed as Taipei Fubon Braves with agreement with Taipei City Government and moved the home arena to Taipei.

Facilities

Home arenas

Training facilities
The Braves' training facility is located at the National Taiwan University of Arts Gymnasium, which is opened on 9 December 2020.

The Braves previously practiced at the Banqiao Civil Sports Center and Shulin Civil Sports Center.

Roster

Current roster

Notable members
 Chung Chih-mong (鍾枝萌) – 6'5", centre, coach; Chinese Taipei squad head coach at 1998 Asian Games.
 Chen Jih-hsing (陳日興) – 5'11", point guard; star player in Taiwan in the 1980s.
 Li Chih-chiang (李志強) – 5'11", point guard, coach; star player in Taiwan in the 1980s.
 Tseng Tseng-chiu (曾增球) – 6'3", small forward; star player in Taiwan in the 1980s.
 Chou Hai-jung (周海容) – 6'3", shooting guard, coach; star player in Taiwan in the 1980s.
 Wang Libin (王立彬) – 6'8", centre; CBA (Taiwan) star player, one of the only two Asian players to achieve triple-double in the game.
 Todd Rowe – 6'7", small forward; CBA (Taiwan) regular season MVP, 4-time scoring champions, shot-block champion.
 Yen Hsing-su (顏行書) – 6'0", point guard; CBA (Taiwan) assist champion.  Head Coach from 2015.
 Song Tao (宋濤) – 6'10", centre; former CBA (Taiwan) star player, tallest player in Taiwan's Division A conference when he played for the Mars.
 Chen Hui (陳暉) – 6'0", point guard; SBL assist champion, All-SBL Team.
 Cheng Chih-lung (鄭志龍) – 6'3", coach; former FIBA Asian All-Star, former CBA (Taiwan) finals MVP.
 Blackie Chen (陳建州) - 6’3", Current Vice-team leader of operations of the team, former forward/centre and National Team Member with Yen Hsing-su
 Joseph Lin, Jeremy Lin's younger brother
 Earl Barron, NBA Finals Champion of 2006
 Jet Chang, former NCAA Division II Final Four Most Outstanding Player and played for Minnesota Timberwolves in 2012 NBA Summer League
 O. J. Mayo, former NBA player

Season-by-season record

See also
 ASEAN Basketball League
 Chinese Basketball Alliance
 Super Basketball League

References

External links
 
 
 
 

 
ASEAN Basketball League teams
P. League+ teams

1983 establishments in Taiwan
Basketball teams established in 1983
Sport in Taipei